The U Sports women's volleyball championship is an annual tournament that features the top eight women's volleyball teams from among competing Canadian universities in U Sports. 11 games are played over a period of three days culminating in a national championship being awarded. The championship trophy, first awarded in 1977, features a two-wheeled oxcart, symbolizing the pioneer era on the Red River in Manitoba. The 2023 champions are the UBC Thunderbirds who have also won the most championships with a total of 13, including six in a row from 2008 to 2013.

History 

While intercollegiate volleyball had been played in Canada since 1947, championships had been played for conference titles only. In 1969, the Canadian Women's Interuniversity Athletic Union (CWIAU) was formed (a precursor to today's U Sports organization) to provide a regulatory body for national competition. For the 1969–1970 season, the Calgary Dinos were named the first unofficial champions. The first official champions were the Manitoba Bisonettes, who were crowned following the 1970–1971 season after they defeated the Toronto Varsity Blues in four sets. While full historical championship results are not readily available, the championship was initially a round-robin tournament where the teams with the best records would then play for the championship. This was changed for the 1983 championship when the tournament changed to single-elimination. The 2020 and 2021 championship tournaments were cancelled due to the COVID-19 pandemic.

Format 
The championship currently consists of an eight-team tournament, with champions from each of the four conferences, one host, an additional OUA team, and two additional Canada West teams. While the berths for the conference champions and host remain consistent year-to-year, the other three invitees can change based on the host's conference and the competitive landscape in U Sports. The championship takes place over three days and features 11 games, with teams seeded 1–8. Teams are ranked by a committee as well as by the ELO ranking used to determine weekly Top 10 rankings nationally. Conference champions can be ranked no lower than 6th place. The team ranked 1st plays the 8th ranked team, 2nd plays 7th, 3rd plays 6th, and 4th plays 5th in the quarter-finals. To ensure common rest times, teams are not re-seeded after the first round, so the winner of 1v8 plays the winner of 4v5 and the winner of 2v7 plays the winner of 3v6. There is also a consolation bracket to determine the third-place winner (bronze medalist) and fifth-place winner. The gold medal game is the last game played in the tournament.

Results

Round Robin Format (1971–1982)

Single Elimination Format (1983–present)

Top 3 finishes table 
The following table includes all known first, second, and third-place finishes, as indicated above. Prior to 1983, there were no third-place finishes, and the second-place finish was the loser of the championship game.

External links 
U Sports Women's Volleyball Championship

References 

U Sports trophies
National volleyball leagues
Volleyball in Canada
U Sports volleyball